Periploca funebris is a moth in the family Cosmopterigidae. It was first described by Ronald W. Hodges in 1962. It is found in North America, where it has been recorded from Arizona and California.

Adults have been recorded on wing in May.

The larvae feed on Juniperus monosperma.

References

Moths described in 1962
Chrysopeleiinae
Taxa named by Ronald W. Hodges
Moths of North America